Hans Julius Wolff (1898–1976) was a German jurist.

1898 births
1976 deaths
German jurists
Scholars of Roman law
Commanders Crosses of the Order of Merit of the Federal Republic of Germany
People from Elberfeld
Jurists from North Rhine-Westphalia